Amanda Marie (full name Amanda Marie Ploegsma), also known by her artist moniker 'Mando Marie',  born 1981, is an American painter formerly based in Colorado, currently based in Amsterdam, Netherlands, and exhibits in both the United States and Europe. She trained at Rocky Mountain College of Art and Design and is best known for her work as a stencilist, including large scale street art designs.

Imagery and media 

Amanda Marie uses graphic stencils and images redolent of  'Golden Age' storybook imagery. In an article for Frame Publishers' online magazine frameweb.com, Carmel McNamara said these images: "straddle a line between comforting and spooky". She frequently features the signature characters of a young boy and girl. In 2012, Boulder Museum of Contemporary Art held a solo exhibition of her work and noted that these stylised figures: "seem to have been lifted from the pages of a mid-twentieth century children’s book and have traded the protective home of childhood nostalgia for a slightly more adventurous and unsettling world, somewhere between dream and reality".

Alongside recurring graphic themes of children and animals, she favors twin, repeated or mirrored imagery, developed with multiple uses of the same stencil on the artwork. Her street art and outdoor paintings and murals incorporate the same primary technique of stencil painting on a large scale. In gallery, museum or other indoor exhibitions, she typically creates artworks using aerosol paint, acrylic and sewing pattern paper, on watercolor paper, canvas, or wood.  She also uses screen printing technique and gel transfers. For outdoor work, the dominant materials are aerosol and acrylic.

In June 2015, Amanda Marie marked the façade of the Quin Hotel in New York City with a signature stencil as part of "Good Story", a solo exhibition curated by Hyland Mather and DK Johnston. Painted during her tenure as the hotel's artist in residence, the stencil commemorated her collaboration with the hotel and is positioned alongside an image of Andy Warhol, created by Blek le Rat.

Notable exhibitions

2015 
 December, SCOPE Art Fair, Miami, Florida
 July - Aug, Trailerpark Festival, Copenhagen, Denmark 
 June, the Quin hotel, Good Story solo exhibition, New York, New York 
 May, JSMA (Jordan Schnitzer Museum of Art), The Many Places We Are solo exhibition, Eugene, Oregon
 March, SCOPE Art Fair, New York, New York

2014 

 July - August, Beautiful Times (beautifultimes.net) an art making adventure and experiment, Boulder, Colorado, New York, New York Philadelphia, Beacon, New York
 April, Center For Audio Visual Expression (C.A.V.E. Gallery), Balancing Act solo exhibition, Venice Beach, California
 January, White Walls Gallery, I Was Just Thinking solo exhibition, San Francisco, California

2013 

 June, SCOPE Art Fair solo exhibition, Basel, Switzerland (Andenken Gallery)
 May, STROKE Art Fair group exhibition, Munich, Germany
 March, SCOPE Art Fair solo exhibition, New York, NY (Andenken Gallery). White Walls Gallery, While We Were Away group exhibition, San Francisco, California
 January, Center For Audio Visual Expression (C.A.V.E. Gallery), From Here On Out solo exhibition, Venice Beach, California

2012 

 December, SCOPE Art Fair solo exhibition, Miami, Florida (Andenken Gallery)
 October, Moniker Art Fair solo exhibition, London, UK
 September, STROKE Art Fair group exhibition, Berlin, Germany
 August, LA Mixtape LeBasse Projects group exhibition,  Los Angeles, California
 May–June,  Kunst RAI Art Fair solo exhibition, Amsterdam, Netherlands
 May, Schunk Museum Newseum Pink Pop group exhibition, Heerlen, Netherlands
 March, Battalion Inaugural Exhibition group exhibition, Amsterdam, Netherlands

2011 

 October, Moniker Art Fair group exhibition, London, UK.
 September, Andenken Gallery, See You Through It solo exhibition, Amsterdam, Netherlands. Illiterate Gallery It All Starts At Home solo exhibition, Denver, Colorado
 Fall 2011, Boulder Museum of Contemporary Art, Purity & Credence solo exhibition, Boulder, Colorado

2010 

 October,  Illiterate Gallery solo exhibition, Denver, Colorado
 May, Streetlab Project Space, Where On Earth Have You Been? group exhibition, Amsterdam, Netherlands

2009 

 December, StreetLab Project Space, Mish Mash KaBash group exhibition, Amsterdam, Netherlands
 February,  Andenken Gallery solo exhibition, Denver, Colorado

2008 

 September, Plastic Chapel, Soft and Furry group exhibition, Denver, Colorado
 June, Andenken Gallery Merge three-person focus exhibition, Denver, Colorado
 May,  Metropolis Gallery, two person exhibition, Lancaster, Pennsylvania

2007 

 December, Transmission Gallery, An Unfinished Storygroup exhibition, Richmond, Virginia. Thinkspace, API Benefit Show group exhibition, Los Angeles, California
 August–October, Andenken Gallery, Generation Gap solo exhibition,  Denver, Colorado

Outdoor projects 

Imaginary Girls, Amsterdam, Netherlands – June 2013
Skinny Dippers, Brooklyn, New York – March 2013
Gravity Kids, San Francisco, California – January 2013
Milk Girls, Greeley, Colorado – October 2012
Concrete Monster, Atzlan Northside Skate Park Mural, Fort Collins, Colorado  – summer 2011
Urban Nature, Denver Botanic Gardens, Denver, Colorado – April–November 2008

References

External sources 
 Amanda Marie website
 Interview for Illiterate talks series on YouTube

Painters from Colorado
1981 births
Living people
Street artists